William S. "Sandy" Stimpson (born April 4, 1952) is an American businessman and politician who serves as the current mayor of Mobile, Alabama. 

He was elected August 27, 2013, defeating incumbent Mayor Sam Jones. In 2017, Stimpson was reelected over Jones in a rematch. In 2021, he defeated Fred Richardson and Karlos Finley with 62.5% of the vote.

Personal life
Stimpson is a 1970 graduate of University Military School, now known as UMS-Wright. He received a B.S. in Civil Engineering from the University of Alabama in 1975, where he was a member of Delta Kappa Epsilon and Theta Tau Professional Engineering Fraternity.

Stimpson began a nearly 40-year career in his family's lumber manufacturing business. Starting at an early age, he worked his way up through virtually every position in the family business including serving as its CFO and ultimately its Executive Vice President.

Stimpson is married to Jean Miller of Brewton, Alabama.

Mayor Sandy Stimpson and his wife Jean have been married since 1975 and have four grown, married children and 14 grandchildren. They are longtime, active members of Ashland Place United Methodist Church.

Mayor Stimpson’s civic and business endeavors, both locally and statewide, have been numerous and varied. He has served on the boards of the Boys & Girls Club of Southwest Alabama; the Mobile Area Chamber of Commerce; the Alabama Policy Institute; the Business Council of Alabama; and the University of Alabama President’s Cabinet.

Career
Upon graduating from the University of Alabama, Stimpson began a 37-year career with Gulf Lumber Company and its successor, Scotch & Gulf Lumber. He was chief financial officer prior to leaving the company to run for office in 2012.

Mayor of Mobile
He was elected August 27, 2013, with 54% of the vote, defeating incumbent Mayor Sam Jones. Stimpson ran on a platform of public safety and economic development. In 2017, he was reelected with 59% of the vote over Jones in a rematch. In 2021, he defeated Fred Richardson and Karlos Finley with 62.5% of the vote.
 
Under Stimpson, Mobile has seen reductions in bonded indebtedness by nearly $100 million and unfunded liabilities for pension and benefits by $200 million, leading to credit rating increases from both Moody's and S&P. During the same period, he has built and maintained a two-month rainy day reserve fund and awarded six raises totaling 17% for city employees.

In 2017, Mayor Stimpson unsuccessfully attempted to decriminalize cannabis in the City of Mobile. In December 2018, he, along with other city officials, was criticized for spending $108,000 on three artificial Christmas trees. The city's special events budget stipulates that any purchase costing more than $7,500 necessitates notification of the council. According to city officials, the trees have a 10- to 12-year life span so they are a long-term investment not falling under the special events budget.

References

External links
Sandy Stimpson profile at the City of Mobile official website

1952 births
Alabama Republicans
Living people
Mayors of Mobile, Alabama
University of Alabama alumni
21st-century American politicians